Joseph W. Tumulty (October 1, 1914 – December 20, 1996) was an American Democratic Party politician from Jersey City, New Jersey who represented the 32nd Legislative District for one term in the New Jersey Senate. He was the nephew of White House secretary Joseph Patrick Tumulty and cousin of U.S. Representative T. James Tumulty.

He was born in Jersey City in 1914 and attended Lincoln High School, earned a B.A. from Columbia University, and a law degree from Fordham University School of Law.

Upon joining the New Jersey Bar, he worked as an attorney in various fields including for the City of Jersey City and Provident Bank. He was elected to the New Jersey Senate in 1973 in the new 32nd District, encompassing parts of Jersey City and North Bergen. However, four years later, he was defeated by former Assemblyman David Friedland by a margin of 77% to 23%. Friedland had the backing of Jersey City Mayor-elect Thomas F. X. Smith.

A resident of Bayonne, New Jersey, Tumulty died on December 20, 1996 at Christ Hospital in Jersey City.

References

1914 births
1996 deaths
Columbia University alumni
Fordham University School of Law alumni
Lincoln High School (New Jersey) alumni
Politicians from Bayonne, New Jersey
Politicians from Jersey City, New Jersey
New Jersey lawyers
Democratic Party New Jersey state senators
20th-century American politicians
20th-century American lawyers